The 1983 Australia rugby union tour of Italy and France was a series of matches played between October and November 1983 in Italy and France by Australia.

Results 

Scores and results list Australia's points tally first.

1983 rugby union tours
1983
1983 in Australian rugby union
1983–84 in European rugby union
1983–84 in French rugby union
rugby union
1983
1983
October 1983 sports events in Europe
November 1983 sports events in Europe